Anthology is a compilation album by Canadian singer-songwriter Bryan Adams which contains songs he recorded from 1978 through 2005. The two-disc set includes songs from 1980 to 2005. A third disc which was a DVD live concert which was recorded in mid-2005 called "Live in Lisbon" was included in North America for a limited time. All the songs are in chronological order of their release, except the last song on the first disc on the North American edition, which was released in 1999. The album's enclosed booklet has notes about the process of the recordings and the credits for each track.

Release and reception 
Anthology, co-produced by Adams, Robert John "Mutt" Lange and Bob Clearmountain, peaked at number 65 on the Billboard 200. The album was released on October 18, 2005, peaking at number 4 on the Canadian Album Chart and at number 29 on the UK Albums Chart. It was certified two times platinum in Canada and gold in the United Kingdom.

Version differences 
On the first disc, the North American edition has "The Best of Me" as the last track, while the International edition moved the song to the second disc, and had "All I Want Is You" instead.

On the second disc, the North American edition has two songs from his album Room Service and a re-recorded version of "When You're Gone" with Pamela Anderson instead of Melanie C. While the international edition replaces the two Room Service Tracks with a new song "I'm Not the Man You Think I Am" (from the movie Colour Me Kubrick) and "Don't Give Up" (a collaboration with Chicane), and the original version of "When You're Gone" with Melanie C instead of the new version.

The original 2-disc North American edition was remastered and reissued September 18, 2007.

Anthology contains a new song, "So Far So Good". It appears as the final track on the second disc in the North American release of the album (and second-to-last in international versions). Originally this song was to be the final song of the album of the same name but was scrapped. According to the enclosed booklet of Anthology, "So Far So Good" was recorded in the same session as "Please Forgive Me" in 1993 and remained incomplete until the release of Anthology in 2005.

Track listing

North American release

Disc one

Disc two

International release

Disc one

Disc two

Personnel 
 Bryan Adams – rhythm guitar, vocals, co-producer
 Keith Scott – lead guitar
 Tommy Mandel – Hammond organ and keyboards
 Dave Taylor – bass guitar
 Mickey Curry – drums
 Jim Vallance – drums and percussion
 Robbie King – Hammond organ
 Larry Klein – bass guitar
 Bill Payne – piano and Hammond organ (on Everything I Do)
 Ed Shearmur – keyboards on (Everything I Do)
 Brian Stanley – bass guitar on Lonely Nights
 James "Hutch" Hutchinson – bass on (Please Forgive Me)
 Phil Nicholas – keyboards and programming (on Waking Up the Neighbours)
 The Tuck Back Twins – background vocals
 Andrew Catlin – Photography

Certifications

References 

Bryan Adams albums
2005 compilation albums
Albums produced by Robert John "Mutt" Lange
Albums produced by Bob Clearmountain
A&M Records compilation albums